Gymnoscelis transapicalis is a moth in the family Geometridae. It is endemic to Borneo.

The wings are fawn with light, regular fasciation. The postmedial lines are strongly angled.

References

External links

Moths described in 1976
transapicalis
Endemic fauna of Borneo